Badis ibn Mansur was briefly the ruler of the Hammadids in 1104.

Hammadids
12th-century rulers in Africa
12th-century Berber people
Berber rulers